Jedd is a given name.  Notable people with the name include:

Jedd Philo Clark Cottrill (1832–1889), American politician
Jedd Ebanks (born 1988), Caymanian footballer
Jedd Fisch (born 1976), American football coach 
Jedd Gardner (born 1988), Canadian football player
Jedd Garet, American sculptor, painter and printmaker
Jedd Gyorko (born 1988), American baseball player
Jedd Hughes (born 1982), Australian singer-songwriter
Jedd P. Ladd (1828–1894), American politician
Jedd Novatt (born 1958), American sculptor

See also
Jed (given name)